Just Once in My Life is the 1965 album by the American music duo the Righteous Brothers. According to Bill Medley, he was allowed to produce most of the tracks in the album, including "Unchained Melody" which was originally intended only as an album track because co-producer Phil Spector was interested only in producing singles.  The album reached No. 9 on Billboard 200 in the United States.

Singles
The title track "Just Once in My Life" was the first single released from the album, and it reached No. 9 on the singles chart in May 1965. The single "Unchained Melody" was initially only intended as a B-side for "Hung on You" from the next album Back to Back, but it became popular and it was then released as an A side, reaching at No. 4 in the United States and No. 14 in the United Kingdom in 1965. It was later included in the soundtrack of 1990 blockbuster film Ghost and the re-released single reached No. 1 in the UK in 1990.

Track listing

Charts

References

1965 albums
The Righteous Brothers albums
Philles Records albums
Albums produced by Phil Spector
Albums produced by Bill Medley
Albums recorded at Gold Star Studios